= News service =

News service may refer to:

- News agency
- Usenet service provider
